Lajos von Malanotti (19 August 1883 – 27 August 1948) was a Hungarian equestrian. He competed in two events at the 1928 Summer Olympics. Malanotti committed suicide in 1948.

References

External links
 

1883 births
1948 suicides
Hungarian male equestrians
Olympic equestrians of Hungary
Equestrians at the 1928 Summer Olympics
Sportspeople from Somogy County
Suicides in Hungary
1948 deaths